N'Gouraba  is a village and rural commune in the Cercle of Kati in the Koulikoro Region of south-western Mali. The commune covers an area of 579 square kilometers and includes 13 villages. In the 2009 census the commune had a population of 15,474. The village of N'Gouraba is 75 km southeast of the Malian capital, Bamako.

References

External links
.

Communes of Koulikoro Region